Javier García González (born 21 November 1942) is a Mexican politician from the Institutional Revolutionary Party. From 2000 to 2003 he served as Deputy of the LVIII Legislature of the Mexican Congress representing Tlaxcala.

References

1942 births
Living people
Politicians from Tlaxcala
Members of the Chamber of Deputies (Mexico)
Institutional Revolutionary Party politicians
21st-century Mexican politicians
National Autonomous University of Mexico alumni
Autonomous University of Tlaxcala alumni
Academic staff of the Autonomous University of Tlaxcala
Members of the Congress of Tlaxcala
Mexican judges